The year 1910 in radio involved some significant events.

Events
Wireless Ship Act of 1910 passed by the United States Congress, requiring all ships of the United States traveling over two-hundred miles off the coast and carrying over fifty passengers to be equipped with wireless radio equipment with a range of one hundred miles.

Births
 16 January – Dwight Weist, American actor and announcer (d. 1991)
 22 March – Elisabeth Barker, British current affairs radio administrator (d. 1986)
 10 April – Olive Shapley, English radio documentary producer and broadcaster (d. 1999)
 3 May – Norman Corwin, American writer-producer (d. 2011)
 17 June – Sam Costa, British crooner, voice actor and disc jockey (d. 1981)
 21 August – D. G. Bridson, English radio producer and author (d. 1980)
 1 September – Charles Maxwell, Scottish-born radio producer (d. 1998)

References

 
Radio by year